Central Institute for the Deaf (CID) is a school for the deaf that teaches students using listening and spoken language, also known as the auditory-oral approach. The school is located in St. Louis, Missouri. CID is affiliated with Washington University in St. Louis.

History
CID was founded in  1914 by Max Aaron Goldstein a renowned ear, nose and throat physician.  Dr. Goldstein set out to do what most thought was impossible at the time - teach deaf children to talk. Goldstein built on techniques he had learned at the Vienna Polyclinic in Austria from Victor Urbantschisch related to methods of teaching the deaf how to speak using "remnants" of hearing.  When CID's new school building opened two years later, it had become enormously successful and it auditory-oral methods were groundbreaking.

Goldstein's original vision included more than a school.  He believed that having physicians, teachers and researchers work side by side on issues related to hearing and deafness was essential.  He began training teachers of the deaf in 1914.  In 1931, that teacher training program affiliated with Washington University in St. Louis, becoming the first deaf education teacher training program in the country to be offered through a college or university.

The 1930s also saw the development of a research department that aimed to better understand the anatomy and science of hearing. Under the direction of Hallowell Davis, who came to CID from Harvard University, the research department would go on to become world-renowned for its work related to hearing and deafness, attracting some of the world's top faculty over the next seven decades.  Davis' early work there was done during World War II on behalf of the Veterans Administration, developing improved hearing aids for those who had sustained hearing loss in combat.  This research laid the foundation for what would become the field of audiology.

It was in 1947 that CID established one of the country's first two university training programs in audiology, a Ph.D. degree, through its affiliation with Washington University in St. Louis.  Within a few months of each other, both CID/Washington University in St. Louis and Northwestern University had enrolled students and officially launched the country's academic training efforts in audiology.  Both programs continue today as top-ranked leaders in audiology education.  It was also in 1947 that CID added a master's program in deaf education, also the first such program in the country.

In September 2003 in the wake of CID's financial difficulties, Washington University in St. Louis acquired the graduate education, clinical, and research divisions, formalizing a longtime connection between the two institutions.  These programs are today known as "CID at Washington University School of Medicine." .  Clinical and research programs are operated through the Department of Otolaryngology; the graduate education programs are operated through the Program in Audiology and Communication Sciences.  The CID school remains a separate, non-profit agency focused on educating children who are deaf and hard of hearing.

Campus
The CID campus is located between Clayton Avenue and Interstate 64 in St. Louis's Central West End, south of the Washington University Medical School.  The westernmost building of the complex is also its oldest, dating to 1928.  The institute's original 1916 building was torn down around 2000, when the modern portions of the complex were built.  The 1928 building, designed by local architect William B. Ittner, was listed on the National Register of Historic Places in 2015 as a reminder of the institute's early history.

Notable alumni
Alan Hurwitz (born 1942), appointed as the tenth President of Gallaudet University in 2010.
Heather Whitestone-McCallum attended CID from 1984 to 1987. In 1995, Whitestone became the first deaf woman to be crowned Miss America.

References

External links
Washington University in St.Louis Website
Washington University in St. Louis - School of Medicine Website
Washington University in St. Louis - Program in Audiology and Communications Website
Washington University in St. Louis - Department of Otolaryngology Website
CID Website

Schools for the deaf in the United States
Washington University in St. Louis
Educational institutions established in 1914
Schools in St. Louis
Private schools in Missouri
Central West End, St. Louis
National Register of Historic Places in St. Louis
1914 establishments in Missouri
Buildings and structures in St. Louis